Dicey, Morris & Collins on the Conflict of Laws (often simply Dicey, Morris & Collins, or even just Dicey & Morris) is the leading English law textbook on the conflict of laws.  It has been described as the "gold standard" in terms of academic writing on the subject, and the "foremost authority on private international law".

Editors
The textbook has had three principal general editors during its life:
 A. V. Dicey, the constitutional scholar and Vinerian Professor of English Law.
 John H. C. Morris
 Lord Collins of Mapesbury, solicitor and later judge.

Since 2015, Professor Jonathan Harris QC has been joint general editor with Lord Collins of Mapesbury.

Between 1922 and 1949 A. Berriedale Keith was also a general editor of the text, but has not been honoured with a permanent place in the book's title.

In the most recent edition, the team of editors includes Professor C G J Morse, Professor David McClean, Professor Adrian Briggs, Professor Jonathan Harris, Professor Campbell McLachlan QC, Professor Andrew Dickinson and Professor Peter McEleavy.

Editions
The first edition was published in 1896 under the title A Digest of the Law of England with reference to the Conflict of Laws.  The 16th and most recent edition was published in 2022.

Format

Unusually for an academic textbook, Dicey, Morris & Collins is set out in a series of "Rules".  The format dates from the time when there was relatively little case law or statute law on the subject, and A.V. Dicey tried to formulate the text from first principles.  The format became something of a self-fulfilling prophecy as during the evolution of the subject judges would often cite rules in the textbook as authoritative propositions for their rulings (see for example, Singularis Holdings Limited v PricewaterhouseCoopers [2014] UKPC 36 at paragraph 12).

Footnotes

Law books
1896 non-fiction books
Conflict of laws